The 2019–20 season was Crewe Alexandra's 143rd season in their history, their 96th in the English Football League and fourth consecutive in League Two. Along with competing in League Two, the club also participated in the FA Cup, EFL Cup and EFL Trophy.

The season covered the period from 1 July 2019 to 30 June 2020.

Crewe vied for promotion to the EFL League One for much of the 2019–20 season, and were top of the table (ahead of Swindon Town on goal difference) when the football season was suspended on 13 March 2020 during the COVID-19 pandemic. On 9 June, Crewe's promotion to League One was confirmed, but Swindon were crowned League Two champions on the basis of average points per game.

Pre-season
The Railwaymen have announced pre-season friendlies against Nantwich Town, Altrincham, Witton Albion, Curzon Ashton Burnley and Wrexham.

Competitions

League Two

League table

Results summary

Results by matchday

Matches
On Thursday, 20 June 2019, the EFL League Two fixtures were revealed.

FA Cup

The first round draw was made on 21 October 2019. The second round draw was made live on 11 November from Chichester City's stadium, Oaklands Park. The third round draw was made live on BBC Two from Etihad Stadium, Micah Richards and Tony Adams conducted the draw.

EFL Cup

The first round draw was made on 20 June. The second round draw was made on 13 August 2019 following the conclusion of all but one first round matches.

EFL Trophy

On 9 July 2019, the pre-determined group stage draw was announced with Invited clubs to be drawn on 12 July 2019.

Transfers

Transfers in

Loans in

Loans out

Transfers out

Player statistics

Appearances and goals

References

Crewe Alexandra
Crewe Alexandra F.C. seasons